Bathurst station is a staffed Via Rail station in Bathurst, New Brunswick, Canada. Bathurst is served by Via Rail's Montreal–Halifax train, the Ocean.

External links

Via Rail page for the Ocean

Buildings and structures in Bathurst, New Brunswick
Via Rail stations in New Brunswick
Transport in Bathurst, New Brunswick